Ufenamate (INN) is a topical analgesic.

References 

Analgesics
Trifluoromethyl compounds